Colostethus is a genus of poison dart frogs native to Central and South America, from Panama south to Colombia, Ecuador, and northern Peru. Their common name is rocket frogs, but this name may refer to frogs in other genera and families, following the taxonomic revision of the genus in 2006.

Taxonomy
Formerly, the genus Colostethus was found to be "rampantly nonmonophyletic" in the taxonomic revision of poison dart frogs published in 2006. Before the revision, it had 138 species, but this was reduced to 18 species, after species of the former Colostethus were distributed among eight genera in two families, that is, in Dendrobatidae and in the newly established family Aromobatidae (e..g., Anomaloglossus). Within Dendrobatidae, many former Colostethus species were moved to Hyloxalus, while three were moved to the new genus Silverstoneia. Nevertheless, Colostethus is still considered paraphyletic because some Colostethus are more closely related to Ameerega than to other Colostethus.

Description
Dorsal colouration is cryptic, brown. A pale oblique lateral stripe is present (but may be broken or incomplete). Dorsal skin is granular posteriorly. In adult males, third finger is swollen.

Species
There are currently 20 species in this genus:

References

External links

 
Poison dart frogs
Amphibians of Central America
Amphibians of South America
Amphibian genera
Taxa named by Edward Drinker Cope